Achyra piuralis is a moth in the family Crambidae. It was described by Hahn William Capps in 1967. It is found in Peru.

References

Moths described in 1967
Moths of South America
Pyraustinae